Marcos Michael (born June 13, 1991 in Cyprus) is a Cypriot footballer who plays for Alki Oroklini. 

Marcos Michael is a product of Bolton Wanderers F.C. youth system and he started his professional career from Anorthosis FC, after the call-up from Anorthosis 2nd teams squad from coach Boban Krčmarević due to the lack of available players to the position of striker.

Club career

Anorthosis Famagusta

Season 2010-11
He made his official debut in the November 20th 2010, against Apollon Limassol, on a local derby. Furthermore he scored his first goal on the 13 minutes he played.

Enosis Neon Parekklisia

Season 2011-12
In the second half of the season he was given on loan to Enosis Neon Parekklisia in the Cypriot Second Division where he scored 10 goals in 12 league appearances.

Olympiakos Nicosia

Season 2012-13
As good enough can be evaluated his season at Olympiacos Nicosia. The 21-year-old striker played 4 times in the starting lineup in the league and another 12 as a substitution. With a total time of 547 minutes, the eleven goals scored is a good performance.

Nikos & Sokratis Erimis

Season 2013-14
Marcos Michael then moved to Cypriot Second Division side Nikos & Sokratis Erimis. He played 3 times in the starting lineup in the league and another 12 as a substitution. With a total time of 616 minutes, he scored twenty times.

References

External links
Footballdatabase.eu Profile

1991 births
Living people
Cypriot footballers
Cypriot expatriate footballers
Association football forwards
Bolton Wanderers F.C. players
Anorthosis Famagusta F.C. players
Enosis Neon Parekklisia FC players
Olympiakos Nicosia players
Nikos & Sokratis Erimis FC players
Aris Limassol FC players
Nea Salamis Famagusta FC players
FC Petrolul Ploiești players
ASIL Lysi players
Othellos Athienou F.C. players
Alki Oroklini players
Cypriot expatriate sportspeople in England
Expatriate footballers in England
Expatriate footballers in Romania